Purple Clover is an English language news and lifestyle online magazine aimed at an audience 50 years and older. It is owned by Whalerock Industries. The website was launched in 2013.

Background
Purple Clover was launched in July, 2013. It is owned by Whalerock Industries, formerly BermanBraun. The site features content tailored to the interests of people aged 50 and above, especially younger Baby boomers and older members of Generation X. It aspires to provide content that is more fun, inspirational, and edgy than is usually pitched at this demographic.

Purple Clover describes the site as being for people who are "...still cool, still curious, and still crazy after all these years."

Format
A feature of Purple Clover is "What's Goin' On," a short take on current news and popular stories, published throughout the day. Major content is divided into these sections: Relationships, Entertainment, Lifestyle, Health, Work, Money, and Life Reimagined.

Purple Clover seeks active engagement with readers on its Facebook page, which is now approaching 8 million fans.

References

External links

TerryMcFly Website

American news websites
Online magazines published in the United States
Lifestyle magazines published in the United States
Magazines established in 2013
Magazines published in California
News magazines published in the United States